Steelton High School, historically known as Felton School, is a historic high school building located at Steelton, Pennsylvania.  It was built in various stages between 1882 and 1990. It was added to the National Register of Historic Places in 2011.

References

School buildings on the National Register of Historic Places in Pennsylvania
Buildings and structures in Dauphin County, Pennsylvania
National Register of Historic Places in Dauphin County, Pennsylvania